A list of films produced in Argentina in 1975:

External links and references
 Argentine films of 1975 at the Internet Movie Database

1975
Argentine
Films